Maryfield is a hamlet north of Torpoint and east of Antony House in southeast Cornwall, England.

References

Hamlets in Cornwall